Carolyn Sherwin Bailey (October 25, 1875 – December 23, 1961) was an American children's author. She was born in Hoosick Falls, New York and attended Teachers College, Columbia University, from which she graduated in 1896. She contributed to the Ladies' Home Journal and other magazines. She published volumes of stories for children like methods of story telling, teaching children and other related subjects, which include Boys and Girls of Colonial Days (1917); Broad Stripes and Bright Stars (1919); Hero Stories (1919); and The Little Rabbit Who Wanted Red Wings (1945). She wrote For the Children's Hour (1906) in collaboration with Clara M. Lewis. In 1947, her book Miss Hickory won the Newbery Medal.

See also

New International Encyclopedia

References

External links 
 
 Miss Hickory Study Guide.  BookRags.com. Retrieved July 7, 2006
 Newbery Medal and Honor Books, 1922–Present.  American Library Association.  Retrieved July 7, 2006.
 Full text of Hero Stories, Milton Bradley Company, 1919.
 
 
 
 

American children's writers
Teachers College, Columbia University alumni
Newbery Medal winners
1875 births
1961 deaths
People from Hoosick Falls, New York
American women children's writers